The 1993–94 season was Manchester City's fifth consecutive season in the top tier of English football, and their second in the Premier League.

Season summary
Manchester City sacked manager Peter Reid just four games into the season, and quickly confirmed Brian Horton of Oxford United as his replacement.

City were a competitive, attacking side during Reid's three seasons as manager, when they finished fifth in his first two seasons and ninth in the next campaign. But under Horton, they found it increasingly difficult to find the net - just 36 goals were scored in the league all season, and no player scored more than 6 goals. The mid-season sale of David White to Leeds United robbed them of one of their last quality performers, and his replacement David Rocastle (signed from Leeds in a separate deal) failed to live up to expectations.

Despite their lack of goals, City avoided the drop and finished 16th - their lowest finish since relegation in 1987. Horton sought to reverse this decline by bringing in Nicky Summerbee, Uwe Rösler and Paul Walsh, while David Rocastle moved to Chelsea after less than a year at Maine Road.

Kit
City introduced a home and third kit for the season, opting to retain the away kit following the traditional pattern of only replacing home and away kits in alternating seasons. The new home kit featured another pseudo-holographic pattern, this time of large Umbro diamonds from the chest to the left shoulder. The third kit simply adopted the away shirt's pinstripes but altered the colours to deep navy blue on white background. Umbro and Brother remained the kit manufacturers and sponsors respectively.

For this season, City also played in a Centenary shirt to celebrate the 100th anniversary of the club adopting the name Manchester City. The kit featured very thin pinstripe diagonal lines instead of the Umbro diamonds of the main shirt, and replaced the club badge with the coat of arms of the city of Manchester itself, ensconced in a laurel wreath and featuring a motto which simply read the club's name and the years of the centenary.

Final league table

Results summary

Results
Manchester City's score comes first

Legend

FA Premier League

FA Cup

League Cup

Squad

Out on loan during season

Left club during season

References

Manchester City F.C. seasons
Manchester City